Viktor Gustafson (born 22 March 1995) is a Swedish football midfielder who plays for Mjällby AIF.

References

1995 births
Living people
Swedish footballers
Association football midfielders
FK Karlskrona players
Mjällby AIF players
Ettan Fotboll players
Superettan players
Allsvenskan players